General José María Yáñez International Airport  is an international airport located in Guaymas, Sonora, Mexico. It handles national and international air traffic for the city of Guaymas. It was named after General José María Yáñez who defended Guaymas against an army of 400 French, German and Chilean filibusters in the 19th century. It is operated by Aeropuertos y Servicios Auxiliares, a federal government-owned corporation.

In 2021, the airport handled 5,369 passengers, and in 2022 it handled 5,921 passengers.

History

Past jet service
A U.S. based airline operated scheduled passenger jet service from Guaymas during the 1970s. In 1975, Hughes Airwest was operating nonstop service to Phoenix (PHX) four days a week with a McDonnell Douglas DC-9-30 jetliner with this flight offering continuing, no change of plane service to San Jose, CA (SJC), San Francisco (SFO), Sacramento (SMF), Eugene, OR (EUG). Portland, OR (PDX) and Seattle (SEA).

Aeroméxico operated daily McDonnell Douglas DC-9-30 jet service from Guaymas nonstop to Tucson (TUS) for a number of years in the 1980s and 1990s.

US Airways used to fly to Phoenix–Sky Harbor from Guaymas with Bombardier CRJ200 aircraft; the route was initially operated by Beechcraft 1900D and Bombardier Dash 8 aircraft. The service was discontinued in late 2012.

Airlines and destinations

Statistics

Passengers

See also 

List of the busiest airports in Mexico

References

External links
 Guaymas Intl. Airport

Airports in Sonora